Luther Whit Maples (November 14, 1891 - January 4, 1971) was a Democratic member of the Mississippi House of Representatives, representing George County, from 1916 to 1920.

Biography 
Luther Whit Maples was born on November 14, 1891, in Clarence, George County, Mississippi. His parents were John Maples and Josephine (Bond) Maples. Luther was a farmer. In November 1915, he was elected to represent George County in the Mississippi House of Representatives as a Democrat. He fought for the United States during World War I. He established the first family juvenile court in Mississippi. He died on January 4, 1971, after a lengthy illness, in Gulfport, Mississippi. He was survived by a widow and three children, two daughters and a son.

References 

1891 births
1971 deaths
People from George County, Mississippi
People from Gulfport, Mississippi
Democratic Party members of the Mississippi House of Representatives